Idoro Akpoeyere Ujoma "Akpo" Sodje (born 31 January 1980) is an English former professional footballer. A journeyman striker, he is usually an instantly recognisable figure on the pitch due to his original – and most of all colourful – hairstyles.

With Queens Park Rangers in 2001, he was loaned out to Stevenage Borough, before beginning a career in non-league football with Margate in 2001. He moved on to Heybridge Swifts via Gravesend & Northfleet the following year, before joining Erith & Belvedere in 2003. He rejoined the Football League with Huddersfield Town in 2004, before joining Darlington the next year, after a successful loan spell. He spent the 2006–07 season with Port Vale, before becoming a Sheffield Wednesday player. He found success and popularity at both clubs, before he joined Charlton Athletic in 2010, after two loan spells. He moved into Scottish football with Hibernian in 2011, before departing in January 2012. Two months later he emigrated to China to sign with Tianjin TEDA to become the first English footballer in the Chinese Super League. He returned to the English game in August 2012, when he joined Preston North End for a brief spell. He joined Scunthorpe United on a short-term basis in January 2013, before signing with Tranmere Rovers in July 2013. He was loaned out to Macclesfield Town in February 2014.

After three of his brothers, Efe, Bright and Stephen Sodje, were sentenced to 18, 21 and 30 months in prison respectively for fraud in September 2017 (having siphoned off money from a charity, the Sodje Sports Foundation), a European Arrest Warrant was issued in relation to Akpo.

Family sporting connections
Born in Greenwich, London, his family originate from Warri, in Delta State, Nigeria. Sodje has four brothers who also play football; three of them professionally and one semi-professionally. Sam and Efe have represented Nigeria at international level. Steve, has never played a Football League game. Another brother, Bright, used to play rugby league and rugby union. His cousin Onome Sodje, also played professionally in England.

Akpo is the youngest of the ten Sodje children:
 In January 2019 it was reported that Akpo refused to return to Britain for questioning by police in a money laundering investigation into his family's business that saw three of his brothers jailed.

Career

Early career

He was signed to First Division Queens Park Rangers, though never made an appearance, instead was loaned out to Conference National outfit Stevenage Borough in March 2001. He scored on his first outing for the club, in a 2–1 win at Morecambe on 31 March, replacing Darran Hay on 36 minutes.

He was still with Stevenage for the start of the 2001–02 season, getting sent off against Doncaster Rovers on 27 August. He left Broadhall Way the next month for Margate, making 16 appearances before the season's end, scoring goals against Yeovil Town, Woking and Hayes.

He began 2002–03 with Margate, playing in their 2–0 defeat at Leigh Genesis on 31 August. The next month he joined Gravesend & Northfleet, scoring on his debut on the 7th, in a 4–1 home win over Nuneaton Borough. Seven days later he scored against Forest Green Rovers, before he made his final appearance on 2 November, getting sent off in a 2–1 defeat at Halifax Town. He was released later in the month and had spells with virtual unknowns Heybridge Swifts (Isthmian League) and Erith & Belvedere (Southern Football League).

At age 24 (at the time he was often reported as 22 or 23), he got a second chance at a professional career, joining Huddersfield Town of League One. He was handed a three-month deal in September 2004, his foot in the door because his brother Efe was captain of the club. He replaced Andy Booth 86 minutes into a 3–0 win at Vale Park on 11 September, Pawel Abbott grabbing the headlines with a hat-trick. In November his contract was extended by six months, allowing him further time to impress boss Peter Jackson. In all he made nine appearances for the "Terriers" in 2004–05, getting just two starts and impressing only in the reserves. In March 2005 he was loaned out to League Two Darlington, after impressing on trial, and scored in the final moments of the season in a 3–1 home win over Cheltenham Town. He was released by Huddersfield in May.

He spent 2005–06 with Darlington. He made 39 appearances, scoring eight goals, including a hat-trick at Chester City in a 4–4 draw on 27 August. His performances caught the eye of Port Vale's manager Martin Foyle, who won his signature in May 2006.

Port Vale
On 5 August 2006, his prolific strike partnership with Leon Constantine had begun – Constantine scoring a brace and Sodje putting the third past Leyton Orient in a 3–0 win. Three days later he scored the only goal at Boundary Park. The pair teamed up to put one each past Preston North End in the League Cup, by the season's end the pair had 42 goals, sixteen coming from Sodje. On 10 March 2007, he also became the first Port Vale player to score four goals in an away league match since Lewis Campbell in 1893, as Vale completed a 5–1 victory at Millmoor against Rotherham United. His hat-trick came in just 18 minutes to break a spell of eight games without scoring. Awarded with the player of the year award, he stated his aim of trying to beat Constantine's 26 goals last season and try to get Vale into the Championship in 2007–08.

Sheffield Wednesday
Vale sold Sodje for an undisclosed fee (later reported to be £300,000) in August 2007, and the player signed a three-year contract with Sheffield Wednesday. The bid (believed to be around £300,000) was made after Sodje was placed on the transfer list, at his own request. At the same time, Wednesday were also attempting to buy Sam from Reading, though the deal did not go through.

He made his debut by coming on as a substitute for Jermaine Johnson in the 63rd minute on 1 September 2007 at Hillsborough, against Bristol City in a 1–0 loss. His full debut came in another 1–0 loss against Preston at Deepdale on 15 September. He scored his first goal for the club on 3 November away at Plymouth Argyle in the 52nd minute to help his club win 2–1. After not scoring in his first six starts and two substitute appearances his first goal spurred him on to score a total of seven league goals in 16 starts and three substitute appearances in his first season at the club, including a brace in a 5–0 victory over Southampton on 10 November. After being hailed by some Wednesdayites as "The black David Hirst", because of his strength and determination, Sodje cemented his place in Wednesday folklore with the opening goal in their 2–0 win over fierce rivals Sheffield United on 19 January. Unfortunately for his new fans, his season was cut short by an ankle injury in February. Despite this setback, he was still voted striker of the year by fans of the club.

Sodje started the 2008–09 season by scoring two goals and setting one up for strike partner Marcus Tudgay in a 4–1 win over Burnley. However, he also picked up a hamstring injury in the match and had to be substituted after just 21 minutes. He made his return coming off of the bench for Jermaine Johnson after 68 minutes against local rivals Sheffield United. Injury limited him to only nine further appearances that season. He picked up a hamstring injury in April.

Charlton Athletic
On 14 November, Sodje joined his brother Sam at Charlton Athletic. Initially signed on a 28-day emergency loan, this signing was made with an option of making the deal permanent. He made his debut on the same day, coming on for Dave Mooney. Sodje scored at Yeovil Town seven days later, after his brother was sent off. On 31 January 2010, he returned to Charlton Athletic on loan until the end of the season. On 20 May 2010, Sodje signed a permanent deal with the Addicks after participating in enough games to activate a clause in his loan deal. Sodje mainly appeared for Charlton as a substitute during the 2010–11 season. His only goal this season came on the opening day in a 1–0 victory for Charlton over AFC Bournemouth.

Hibernian
Sodje signed for Scottish Premier League (SPL) side Hibernian on a free transfer on 31 January 2011. He made his debut two days later, setting up the opening goal in a 2–0 win against St Mirren. Sodje scored his first goal for the club in their next game, a 2–1 win over Kilmarnock. Sodje scored six goals for Hibs in the latter part of the 2010–11 season, as well as winning a penalty in an Edinburgh derby which saw opposing player Marius Žaliūkas sent off, but became a squad player in the following season. In January 2012, Hibs allowed Sodje to join Belgian club K.V.C. Westerlo on trial, and then released him from his contract on 31 January.

Tianjin Teda
In March 2012, he signed a contract with Chinese Super League side Tianjin TEDA, then managed by Josip Kuže. The club represent the city of Tianjin, and play at the 37,450 capacity TEDA Football Stadium. The league restricts clubs to sign at most five non-Chinese players, the other four in 2012 being Lucian Goian, Sjoerd Ars, Veliče Šumulikoski, and Milan Susak. He scored his first and the only goal for Tianjin on 16 March, in a 2–1 defeat by Qingdao Jonoon at Qingdao Tiantai Stadium. On 1 July, Sodje was released by Tianjin TEDA.

Preston North End
In August 2012, Sodje signed for Preston North End, having impressed with four goals in three games during pre-season. He won a first team place after coming off the bench to score against Bournemouth, and then followed this up with goals against Crystal Palace and Swindon Town in his next two games. Following an impressive start to his career at Deepdale, Sodje signed for a second-month. He then signed another contract, to remain at Preston for a third month. However, he refused to stay at the club beyond December, leaving his final tally at seven goals in 17 appearances.

Scunthorpe United
Sodje signed with Scunthorpe United in January 2013 on a short-term deal lasting until the end of the 2012–13 season, and stated that "I'm feeling good and I'm glad that everything is sorted and I've got the chance to work with Brian Laws again... There's no doubt that we'll be able to stay up. We've been having a bad time but that is all changing now." After three away games, he marked his debut at Glanford Park with two goals in a 2–1 win over Portsmouth. He hit six goals in 16 games as the "Iron" were relegated into League Two, and was released in the summer.

Tranmere Rovers
In July 2013, Sodje signed a one-year contract with Ronnie Moore's Tranmere Rovers. He made eleven appearances without scoring a goal at the start of the 2013–14 season.

On 20 February 2014, Sodje joined Conference side Macclesfield Town on a one-month loan; brother Efe was manager John Askey's assistant at the "Silkmen". He played five games for the "Silkmen" without scoring, and he was released by Tranmere Rovers after returning to Prenton Park in April.

Style of play
Sodje was an energetic, strong and aggressive forward.

Personal life
Two of his brothers, Sam and Efe, were put on trial in the UK in September 2017 for money laundering after allegedly being involved in channelling proceeds from scams which targeted firms in Colombia, India, Italy and Abu Dhabi; Sodje himself was also alleged to have taken part in the crime but declined to return to Britain from his home in Dubai to be interviewed by police.

In September 2017, Efe, Bright and Stephen Sodje were sentenced to 18, 21 and 30 months in prison respectively for fraud, having siphoned off money from a charity, the Sodje Sports Foundation. Akpo, 37, is wanted in connection with the fraud, and a European Arrest Warrant has been issued.

Career statistics

Honours
Port Vale F.C. Player of the Year: 2007
Sheffield Wednesday Striker of the Year: 2008

References

External links

1981 births
Living people
Footballers from Greenwich
English footballers
English people of Nigerian descent
Black British sportspeople
Association football forwards
Queens Park Rangers F.C. players
Stevenage F.C. players
Margate F.C. players
Ebbsfleet United F.C. players
Heybridge Swifts F.C. players
Erith & Belvedere F.C. players
Huddersfield Town A.F.C. players
Darlington F.C. players
Port Vale F.C. players
Sheffield Wednesday F.C. players
Charlton Athletic F.C. players
Hibernian F.C. players
English expatriate footballers
Expatriate footballers in China
Chinese Super League players
Tianjin Jinmen Tiger F.C. players
Preston North End F.C. players
Scunthorpe United F.C. players
Macclesfield Town F.C. players
English Football League players
National League (English football) players
Isthmian League players
Scottish Premier League players
English expatriate sportspeople in the United Arab Emirates
Fugitives wanted by the United Kingdom
Tranmere Rovers F.C. players